Moti Abba Gomol was King of the Gibe Kingdom of Jimma (reigned 1862–1878).

Reign
Abba Gomol was the son of Abba Bok'a and a woman from the Busase family of the Kingdom of Kaffa.

His major achievement was conquering the Kingdom of Garo, which became the southeast portion of the Kingdom of Jimma.

Notes

Kings of Gibe
Year of birth unknown
Year of death unknown
19th-century monarchs in Africa